Delouie (also Romanized as Dowlūī and Delūī) is a village in Howmeh Rural District, in the Central District of Gonabad County, Razavi Khorasan Province, Iran. At the 2006 census, its population was 1,360, in 411 families.

Delouie is located 3 km from Gonabad, at an altitude of 1038 metres.
The most important products of Delouie are saffron, grapes, apricot, whiteberry, wheat, and pomegranate.

References‌ 

Populated places in Gonabad County